Gamasellus spiricornis is a species of mite in the family Ologamasidae.

References

spiricornis
Articles created by Qbugbot
Animals described in 1882